Dialoxa is a genus of moths of the family Noctuidae.

Species
It contains two species:
 Dialoxa arduine
 Dialoxa marcella

References

Natural History Museum Lepidoptera genus database

Calpinae